Shadi (also Romanized as Shādī; also known as Shād) is a village in Dasht-e Taybad Rural District, Miyan Velayat District, Taybad County, Razavi Khorasan Province, Iran. At the 2006 census, its population was 64, in 20 families.

References 

Populated places in Taybad County